Neil Martin (born 1940) is a Scottish football player and manager.

Neil Martin may also refer to:
Neil Martin (cricketer, born 1969), English cricketer
Neil Martin (cricketer, born 1979), English cricketer (Middlesex)
Neil Martin (cyclist) (born 1960), British cyclist
Neil Martin (motorsport) (born 1972), Formula 1 strategist
Neil Martin (swimmer) (born 1955), Australian Olympic swimmer